Hydrangea, commonly named the hortensia, is a genus of more than 75 species of flowering plants native to Asia and the Americas. By far the greatest species diversity is in eastern Asia, notably China, Korea, and Japan. They can be either deciduous or evergreen, though the widely cultivated temperate species are all deciduous.

Hydrangea is derived from Greek and means ‘water vessel’ (from  húdōr "water" +  ángos or  angeîon "vessel"), in reference to the shape of its seed capsules. The earlier name, Hortensia, is a Latinised version of the French given name Hortense, honoring French astronomer and mathematician Nicole-Reine Hortense Lepaute. This claim is disputed in page 88 on citation 10 at Nicole-Reine Hortense Lepaute page, which says: "Larousse considers this an injustice, and remarks that it has led many persons to the erroneous notion that "Hortensia" was one of her names; it was probably only the Latin adjective from "hortus". The flowers of hydrangea act as natural pH indicators, sporting blue flowers when the soil is acidic and pink when the soil is alkaline.

Life cycle
Hydrangea flowers are produced from early spring to late autumn; they grow in flowerheads (corymbs or panicles) most often at the ends of the stems. Typically the flowerheads contain two types of flowers: small non-showy fertile flowers in the center or interior of the flowerhead, and large, sterile showy flowers with large colorful sepals (tepals). These showy flowers are often extended in a ring, or to the exterior of the small flowers. Plants in wild populations typically have few to none of the showy flowers, while cultivated hydrangeas have been bred and selected to have more of the larger type flowers.

There are two flower arrangements in hydrangeas with corymb style inflorescences, which includes the commonly grown "bigleaf hydrangea"—Hydrangea macrophylla. Mophead flowers are large round flowerheads resembling pom-poms or, as the name implies, the head of a mop. In contrast, lacecap flowers bear round, flat flowerheads with a center core of subdued, small flowers surrounded by outer rings of larger flowers having showy sepals or tepals. The flowers of some rhododendrons and viburnums can appear, at first glance, similar to those of some hydrangeas.

Hydrangea flowers, when cut, dehydrate easily and wilt very quickly due to the large surface area of the petals. A wilted hydrangea may have its hydration restored by first having its stem immersed in boiling water; as the petals of the hydrangea can also absorb water, the petals may then be immersed, in room-temperature water, to restore the flower's hydration.

Colors and soil acidity
 
Hydrangea flower color can change based on the pH in soil. As the graph depicts, soil with a pH of 5.5 or lower will produce blue flowers, a pH of 6.5 or higher will produce pink hydrangeas, and soil in between 5.5 and 6.5 will have purple hydrangeas. White hydrangeas cannot be color-manipulated by soil pH because they do not produce pigment for color. In other words, while the hue of the inflorescence is variable dependent upon cultural factors, the color saturation is genetically predetermined.  In most species, the flowers are white. In some, however, (notably H. macrophylla), they can be blue, red, or purple, with color saturation levels ranging from the palest of pinks, lavenders & powder blues, to deep, rich purples, bordeauxs, and royal blues. In these species, floral color change occurs due to the availability of aluminum ions, a variable which itself depends upon the soil pH. For H. macrophylla and H. serrata cultivars, the flower color can be determined by the relative acidity of the soil: an acidic soil (pH below 7), will have available aluminum ions and typically produce flowers that are blue to purple, whereas an alkaline soil (pH above 7) will tie up aluminum ions and result in pink or red flowers. This is caused by a color change of the flower pigments in the presence of aluminum ions which can be taken up into hyperaccumulating plants.

Partial list of species

Hydrangea anomala – (climbing hydrangea) Himalaya, southwest China
Hydrangea arborescens – (smooth hydrangea) eastern North America
Hydrangea aspera – China, Himalaya
Hydrangea bretschneideri – China
Hydrangea chinensis – China and Taiwan
Hydrangea chungii – China
Hydrangea cinerea – (ashy hydrangea) eastern United States
Hydrangea coenobialis – China
Hydrangea davidii – China
Hydrangea glaucescens – China, Myanmar and Vietnam
Hydrangea gracilis – China
Hydrangea heteromalla – Himalaya, west and north China
Hydrangea hirta – Japan
Hydrangea hydrangeoides – Ulleungdo, Japan, Kurils
Hydrangea hypoglauca – China
Hydrangea integrifolia – China
Hydrangea involucrata – Japan, Taiwan
Hydrangea jelskii – Andes
Hydrangea kwangsiensis – China
Hydrangea kwangtungensis – China
Hydrangea lingii – China
Hydrangea linkweiensis – China
Hydrangea longifolia – China
Hydrangea longipes – western China
Hydrangea macrocarpa – China
Hydrangea macrophylla – (bigleaf hydrangea) southeast Japan, southern China
Hydrangea mangshanensis – China
Hydrangea paniculata – (panicled hydrangea) eastern China, Japan, Korea, Sakhalin
Hydrangea peruviana – Costa Rica and Panama, Andes
Hydrangea petiolaris – (climbing hydrangea) Japan, Korea, Sakhalin
Hydrangea quercifolia – (oakleaf hydrangea) southeast United States
Hydrangea radiata – (silverleaf hydrangea) southeast United States
Hydrangea robusta – China, Himalaya
Hydrangea sargentiana – western China
Hydrangea scandens – southern Japan south to the Philippines
Hydrangea serrata – Japan, Korea
Hydrangea serratifolia – Chile, western Argentina
Hydrangea strigosa – China
Hydrangea stylosa – China
Hydrangea tarapotensis – Andes
Hydrangea xanthoneura – China
Hydrangea zhewanensis – China

Fossil record
Hydrangea alaskana is a fossil species recovered from paleogene strata in Jaw Mountain Alaska.

Four fossil seeds of Hydrangea polonica have been extracted from borehole samples of the Middle Miocene fresh water deposits in Nowy Sacz Basin, West Carpathians, Poland.

Cultivation and uses
Hydrangeas are popular ornamental plants, grown for their large flowerheads, with Hydrangea macrophylla being by far the most widely grown. It has over 600 named cultivars, many selected to have only large sterile flowers in the flowerheads. Hydrangea macrophylla, also known as bigleaf hydrangea, can be broken up into two main categories; mophead hydrangea and lacecap hydrangea. Some are best pruned on an annual basis when the new leaf buds begin to appear. If not pruned regularly, the bush will become very 'leggy', growing upwards until the weight of the stems is greater than their strength, at which point the stems will sag down to the ground and possibly break. Other species only flower on 'old wood'. Thus new wood resulting from pruning will not produce flowers until the following season.

The following cultivars and species have gained the Royal Horticultural Society's Award of Garden Merit under the synonym Schizophragma: 
S. hydrangeoides var. concolor 'Moonlight' 
S. hydrangeoides var. hydrangeoides 'Roseum'
S. integrifolium

Hydrangea root and rhizome are indicated for treatment of conditions of the urinary tract in the Physicians' Desk Reference for Herbal Medicine and may have diuretic properties. Hydrangeas are moderately toxic if eaten, with all parts of the plant containing cyanogenic glycosides. Hydrangea paniculata is reportedly sometimes smoked as an intoxicant, despite the danger of illness and/or death due to the cyanide.

The flowers on a hydrangea shrub can change from blue to pink or from pink to blue from one season to the next depending on the acidity level of the soil. Adding organic materials such as coffee grounds, citrus peel or eggshells will increase acidity and turn hydrangea flowers blue, as described in an article on Gardenista.
A popular pink hydrangea called Vanilla Strawberry has been named "Top Plant" by the American Nursery and Landscape Association.

The hybrid "Runaway Bride Snow White", bred by Ushio Sakazaki from Japan, was named Plant of the Year at the 2018 RHS Chelsea Flower Show.

In culture
In Japan, ama-cha, 甘茶, meaning sweet tea, is another herbal tea made from Hydrangea serrata, whose leaves contain a substance that develops a sweet taste (phyllodulcin). For the fullest taste, fresh leaves are crumpled, steamed, and dried, yielding dark brown tea leaves. Ama-cha is mainly used for kan-butsu-e (the Buddha bathing ceremony) on April 8 every year—the day thought to be Buddha's birthday in Japan. During the ceremony, Ama-cha is poured over a statue of Buddha and served to people in attendance. A legend has it that on the day Buddha was born, nine dragons poured Amrita over him; ama-cha is substituted for Amrita in Japan.

In Korean tea, Hydrangea serrata (hangul:산수국 hanja:) is used for an herbal tea called sugukcha (수국차) or isulcha (이슬차).

The pink hydrangea has risen in popularity all over the world, especially in Asia. The given meaning of pink hydrangeas is popularly tied to the phrase, "You are the beat of my heart," as described by the celebrated Asian florist Tan Jun Yong, where he was quoted saying, "The light delicate blush of the petals reminds me of a beating heart, while the size could only match the heart of the sender!"

Hydrangea quercifolia was declared the official state wildflower of Alabama in 1999.

Hydrangeas were used by the Cherokee people. A mild diuretic and cathartic, it was considered a valuable remedy for removal of stone and gravel in the bladder.

Bee-friendliness
Hydrangea variants vary in bee-friendliness and their ability to feed pollinators. In general, common hydrangeas are not bee-friendly because their flowers are sterile, e.g. Hydrangea macrophylla hortensis (mophead) and H. paniculata (limelight).
Those that give food for bees and pollinators are: 
 Hydrangea anomala petiolaris
 Hydrangea arborescens: Smooth hydrangeas are versatile and spectacular, and can be used in a variety of landscape settings, including foundation plantings, perennial gardens, hedges, cut flower gardens, naturalising, pollinator, and wildlife gardens.
 Hydrangea aspera: 
 Hydrangea mycrophylla: Bigleaf hydrangeas are classic choices for flower gardens, cottage gardens, and seaside plantings. They can also be used for low hedges or edging, and they offer a splash of colour to foundation plantings.
 Hydrangea paniculata (grandiflora): Panicle hydrangeas are the most sun-tolerant and wilt-resistant of the hydrangeas. It's perfect for Specimen plantings, mixed borders, and mass plantings. It can be used as a hedge or a screen. Excellent for both fresh and dried cut flowers.
 Hydrangea quercifolia: Oakleaf hydrangea blooms on old growth. It thrives in damp, well-drained environments. In colder climates, winter protection may be required. Shrub with a deciduous appearance. Apply a slow-release fertiliser formulated for trees and shrubs in the early spring.

Gallery

Diseases

References

External links
erowid.org
Flora of Nepal: Hydrangea species list
Hydrangea – selecting shrubs
Hydrangea species and hybrids
Propagating Hydrangeas
Red Listing of Threatened Hydrangeas

Hydrangea
Cornales genera
Christmas plants
Asterid genera